I Love You So Much It Hurts is an album by the cellist Ernst Reijseger and the pianist Franco D'Andrea, recorded in 1997 and released on the Winter & Winter label.

Reception

In his review for AllMusic, Ken Dryden stated: "The pairing of avant-garde cellist Ernst Reijseger with post-bop pianist Franco D'Andrea provides anything but predictable music... Recommended".

Track listing
All compositions by Franco D'Andre except as indicated
 "In a Sentimental Mood" (Duke Ellington, Manny Kurtz, Irving Mills) - 2:56
 "Night and Day" (Cole Porter) - 4:53
 "Two Colours" - 5:35
 "Ma l'Amore No" (Giovanni D'Anzi) - 8:58
 "Afro Abstraction" - 9:13
 "Hi There" (Sean Bergin) - 3:04
 "Amore Baciami" (Carlo Alberto Rossi) - 4:12
 "You Do Something to Me" (Porter) - 6:50
 "Complex Eight" (Misha Mengelberg) - 6:18
 "Reflections" (Thelonious Monk) - 1:51
 "I Love You So Much It Hurts" (Floyd Tillman) - 1:38

Personnel
Ernst Reijseger - cello
Franco D'Andrea - piano

References

Winter & Winter Records albums
Ernst Reijseger albums
Franco D'Andrea albums
2002 albums